Robin Leclerc (or Leclercq; born 5 November 1952) is a French former professional footballer who played as a midfielder.

Career

Early career 
Leclerc was a youth product of JS Suresnes's football school. In 1970, he joined Châteauroux. In one season with the club in the Division 2, he made a total of 14 appearances. However, he joined the reserve side of Paris Saint-Germain in 1971.

Paris Saint-Germain 
In 1972, Paris Saint-Germain split into two; Paris FC kept the first team, but lost the club identity, while PSG were handed the reserve team, and kept the club identity. Having been part of the B team the previous season, Leclerc was now one of PSG's key players during the 1972–73 season in the Division 3. He would make 25 appearances and score 3 goals in all competitions that season.

From 1973 to 1976, Leclerc stayed at PSG, but mostly played for the B team. However, he notably participated in two matches in the Division 1 during the 1974–75 season. Leclerc left the club in 1976.

Poissy 
In 1977, Leclerc signed for Poissy. He would go on to retire after his departure in 1978.

After football 
Later in his life, Leclerq became a football agent in Bath, England.

References

External links 
 
 

1952 births
Living people
French footballers
Footballers from Paris
Association football midfielders
LB Châteauroux players
Paris Saint-Germain F.C. players
AS Poissy players
Ligue 1 players
Ligue 2 players
French Division 3 (1971–1993) players
Association football agents